Buddha cave may refer to many caves in Asia which are noted for their Buddha statues:

Afghanistan 
Bamiyan Buddhas and caves.

China
Beishan Rock Carvings, Dazu, Chongqing 
Dazu Rock Carvings, Dazu, Chongqing 
Bingling Temple, Gansu 
Mogao Caves, Dunhuang, Gansu
Mati Temple, Sunan, Gansu 
Maijishan Grottoes, Tianshui, Gansu 
Shuilian Grottoes, Tianshui, Gansu 
Tiantishan Grottoes, Wuwei, Gansu 
Yulin Caves, Guazhou, Gansu 
Western Thousand Buddha Caves, Gansu
Longmen Grottoes, Henan 
Beishan Temple, Xining, Qinghai 
Anyue Stone Carvings, Anyue, Sichuan 
Oriental Buddha Park, Leshan, Sichuan 
Tuoshan, Qingzhou, Shandong 
Yungang Grottoes, Shanxi 
A-ai Buddha Cave, Xinjiang 
Bezeklik Thousand Buddha Caves, Xinjiang
Kumtura Thousand Buddha Caves, Xinjiang
Kizil Caves, Xinjiang
Shibaoshan, Yunnan

India
Saspol Caves, Kashmir 
Ajanta Caves, Maharashtra
Bhaja Caves, Maharashtra 
Ellora Caves, Maharashtra
Karla Caves, Maharashtra
Pandavleni Trishran Caves, Maharashtra
Gandharpale Caves, Maharashtra
Bedse Caves, Maharashtra
Dharashiv Caves, Maharashtra
Elephanta Caves, Maharashtra
Ghorawadi Caves, Maharashtra
Jogeshwari Caves, Maharashtra
Kanheri Caves, Maharashtra
Karad Caves, Maharashtra
Kondana Caves, Maharashtra
Kuda Caves, Maharashtra
Lenyadri, Maharashtra
Mahakali Caves, Maharashtra
Mandapeshwar Caves, Maharashtra
Nadsur Caves, Maharashtra
Nenavali Caves, Maharashtra
Panhalakaji Caves, Maharashtra
Pitalkhora, Maharashtra
Shelarwadi Caves, Maharashtra
Shirwal Caves, Maharashtra
Shivneri Caves, Maharashtra
Thanale Caves, Maharashtra
Tulja Caves, Maharashtra
Wai Caves, Maharashtra

Laos 
Tham Pha, Khammouane Province
Pak Ou Caves, Luang Prabang

Myanmar
Pindaya Caves, Shan State

Nepal
Sky Caves of Mustang

Sri Lanka
Dambulla cave temple

Thailand
Wat Tham, Phang Nga
Tham Khao Luang Cave, Phetchaburi 
Wat Suwannakuha, Takua Thung
Wat Tham Chiang Dao, Chiang Dao
Wat Tham Pla, Maesai
Tham Tu Pu, Chiang Rai

Tibet
Donggar Piyang Grottoes, Ngari 

Caves of Asia
Buddha statues